Brandon Latrel Keith (born November 21, 1984) is an American football offensive tackle who last played for the Minnesota Vikings of the National Football League. He was drafted by the Arizona Cardinals in the seventh round of the 2008 NFL Draft. He played college football at Northern Iowa. Coaches at Salt River High School in the Salt River Pima Indian County

High school career
Keith attended McAlester High School in McAlester, Oklahoma, where tallied over 70 pancake blocks earned first-team all-state honors from the Daily Oklahoman and the Tulsa World as a senior in 2002.

Considered a four-star recruit by Rivals.com, Keith was rated as the No. 20 offensive tackle in the nation. He committed to the University of Oklahoma, but did not qualify academically, and eventually headed for junior college.

College career
After redshirting his first year at Northeastern Oklahoma A&M College, Keith received first-team all-Southwest League honors and second-team NJCAA All-American in 2004. Honoring his commitment to the Sooners, Keith was a member of the 2005 Oklahoma Sooners football team but did not see action. Unsatisfied with his role, he decided to transfer to Northern Iowa.

Keith saw action in seven games for the Panthers, and started two. He missed four games with a bone bruise in his right knee. Keith was part of the offense ranked No. 11 in the nation in scoring (31.0 points/game) in 2006.

In 2007, Keith started 11 games at right tackle, helping to guide the Panthers to a perfect 11-0 regular season and a No. 1 national ranking for six weeks. He received Associated Press All-America third-team honors and was named an honorable mention All-American by The Sports Network.

Professional career

2008 NFL Draft
Despite impressive showings at Northern Iowa's Pro Day, where he ran a sub-5.0 40-yard dash at 345 pounds, Keith was not regarded as one of the top offensive tackles in the draft, due to his unpolished footwork and lack of consistency. He was selected 225th overall by the Arizona Cardinals.

After signing with the Minnesota Vikings on May 6, 2013, Keith was released by the Vikings on August 31, 2013 (along with 18 others) to get to a 53-man roster.

References

External links
Arizona Cardinals bio
UNI Panthers bio

1984 births
Living people
People from Silsbee, Texas
American football offensive tackles
Northern Iowa Panthers football players
Arizona Cardinals players
Minnesota Vikings players
Northeastern Oklahoma A&M Golden Norsemen football players